The Wonhyo Bridge crosses the Han River in South Korea and connects the districts of Yongsan-gu and Yeongdeungpo-gu. It was the 13th to be built on the Han River.

History
July 1978: Construction started
October 27, 1981: Wonhyo Bridge opened
December 10, 1981: Introduction of toll fees
February 1, 1983: Dongah Construction donated Wonhyo Bridge to the Seoul Metropolitan City, and collection of toll fees discontinued

Toll Fees
Toll fees were collected from December 10, 1981, but the flow of traffic was rather low, as vehicles avoided crossing the bridge due to the imposition of the toll fees.  In fact, the toll fees collected were barely adequate to supply power for the street lamps, and on February 1, 1983, Dongah Construction donated the bridge to Seoul Metropolitan City.  After the ownership rights were donated, the toll gates were removed.

Film Appearances
Wonhyo Bridge was selected as the set for a fighting scene included in the 2006 Korean film The Host directed by Bong Joon-ho.  In the movie, Wonhyo Bridge was where the creature was hiding, and where the daughter of the main character was kidnapped.  The reason for selecting this location was that it fit well with the film's concept of a sewer under a bridge, and the external appearance of Wonhyo Bridge is more dynamic than other bridges, and this added tension.

References

Yeouido
Yongsan District
Bridges in Seoul
Bridges completed in 1981
Bridges over the Han River (Korea)